HotelTonight is a travel agency and metasearch engine owned by Airbnb and accessible via website and mobile app. It is used to book last-minute lodging in the Americas, Europe, Japan and Australia.

History
HotelTonight was founded in December 2010 by Sam Shank, Jared Simon, and Chris Bailey. When it first launched in January 2011, the mobile app was only available in the US and on Apple products. The app launched on Android devices in July 2011 and now includes cities in Europe, Canada, Central America and South America.

Fundraising 
In May 2011, the company raised a $3.25 million Series A round from Battery Ventures, Accel Partners, and First Round Capital. In November 2011, they raised $9 million from Accel Partners, Battery Ventures, and First Round Capital. In June 2012, a Series C round from U.S. Venture Partners, Accel Partners, Battery Ventures, and First Round Capital raised another $23 million. In September 2013, the company raised $45 million in a Series D round led by Coatue Management, bringing its total funding to $80.5 million.

Operations 
In October 2014, HotelTonight expanded from same-day only bookings to allowing users to book rooms up to 7 days in advance. In September 2018, they began allowing bookings through the website.

In March 2019, HotelTonight was acquired by Airbnb for approximately $450 million in cash and stock.

References

External links
 

American travel websites
American companies established in 2010
Hospitality companies established in 2010
Internet properties established in 2010
2019 mergers and acquisitions
Online travel agencies
Companies based in San Francisco
2010 establishments in California